Vladimir Ivanov (born 28 April 1949) is a Soviet speed skater. He competed in two events at the 1976 Winter Olympics.

References

1949 births
Living people
Soviet male speed skaters
Olympic speed skaters of the Soviet Union
Speed skaters at the 1976 Winter Olympics
Sportspeople from Izhevsk